The 1973 NCAA University Division baseball tournament was played at the end of the 1973 NCAA University Division baseball season to determine the national champion of college baseball.  The tournament concluded with eight teams competing in the College World Series, a double-elimination tournament in its twenty-seventh year.

Eight regional districts sent representatives to the College World Series with preliminary rounds within each district serving to determine each representative.  These events would later become known as regionals.  Each district had its own format for selecting teams, resulting in 32 teams participating in the tournament at the conclusion of their regular season, and in some cases, after a conference tournament.

The twenty-seventh tournament's champion was Southern California, led by head coach Rod Dedeaux, and Dave Winfield of Minnesota. was the Most Outstanding Player. He was the starting pitcher in two games, tossing 17 innings, allowing nine hits, one earned run, and striking out 29. In addition, Winfield batted .467 in the Series. 

USC became the first team to win four consecutive College World Series and was undefeated (5–0) in the double-elimination format.  The final game drew 12,050, the sixth highest to date, and attendance for the fourteen-game Series was 65,356, a new record by nearly seven thousand.

Tournament
The opening rounds of the tournament were played across eight district sites across the country, each consisting of between three and six teams. The winners of each District advanced to the College World Series.

Bold indicates winner.

District 1 at Boston, MA

District 2 at West Windsor, NJ

District 3 at Starkville, MS

District 4 at Carbondale, IL

District 5 at Tulsa, OK

District 6 at San Antonio, TX

District 7 at Spokane, WA & Mesa, AZ

District 8 at Los Angeles, CA

College World Series

Participants

Results

Bracket

Game results

 Final game was on Wednesday night, with an attendance of 12,050.

The Minnesota vs. USC semi final game
Recalled each year as perhaps the most amazing game in CWS history, Minnesota faced a USC team that featured future major leaguers Rich Dauer, Fred Lynn, and Roy Smalley. Dave Winfield was the starting pitcher for Minnesota. In his first game vs. Oklahoma, he struck out 14 in shutting out the Sooners, 1-0. In the semi final vs. defending champion USC, Winfield had struck out 15 through 8 innings, allowing only an infield single as Minnesota built a 7-0 lead. USC's Rich Dauer said "In my whole career, even facing the big boys in the majors, I have never seen anything like that," When Dave let go of the ball, it was three feet in front of your face and it seemed like it was going 110 miles an hour."

In the ninth inning, USC opened with a base hit but the next batter grounded into what appeared to be a double play. Television replays indicated the batter was out at first base, but the umpire called him safe and Minnesota coach Dick Siebert was thrown out of the game arguing the call. Two more singles and a key error by the first baseman led to three runs and Winfield was relieved and went to left field. Two relievers allowed five more runs and USC won the game 8–7. "I have played in a lot of memorable big games during my career," Winfield said. "World Series games, league championship games, all-star games, all kinds. But I will never forget that game against USC. Never."

All-Tournament Team
The following players were members of the All-Tournament Team.

Notable players
 Arizona State: Gary Allenson, Eddie Bane, Jim Lentine, Paul Moskau, Jim Otten, John Poloni, Jim Umbarger, Bump Wills
 Georgia Southern: Jim Morrison, John Tamargo
 Harvard:
 Minnesota: Steve Comer, Dave Winfield
 Oklahoma: Keith Drumright, Bob Shirley, Joe Simpson, Jackson Todd
 Penn State:
 Southern California: Rich Dauer, Steve Kemp, Dennis Littlejohn, Fred Lynn, Ed Putman, Pete Redfern, Randy Scarbery, Roy Smalley
 Texas: Bobby Cuellar, Jim Gideon, Keith Moreland, Ken Pape, Rich Wortham

See also
 1973 NCAA College Division baseball tournament
 1973 NAIA World Series

References

NCAA Division I Baseball Championship
1973 NCAA University Division baseball season
Baseball in San Antonio